Clarks Creek is a  long 2nd order tributary to Mallard Creek in Mecklenburg County, North Carolina.

Course
Clarks Creek rises about 1.5 miles east of Joplor, North Carolina and then flows south-southeast through the northern suburbs of Charlotte to eventually join Mallard Creek.

Watershed
Clarks Creek drains  of area, receives about 46.3 in/year of precipitation, has a wetness index of 424.00, and is about 15% forested.

References

Rivers of North Carolina
Rivers of Mecklenburg County, North Carolina